André de Ridder is a German conductor of classical music based in Berlin and working all over the world.

Work 
De Ridder studied conducting with Leopold Hager at the University of Music and Performing Arts, Vienna and with Sir Colin Metters at the Royal Academy of Music in London. The conductor is equally engaged in different genres of music, be it pop, electronic music or opera, ancient music or contemporary compositions. He performs regularly at leading festivals such as the BBC Promenade Concerts or the Edinburgh International Festival, the Holland Festival, the Venice Biennale, the Manchester International Festival or at the Sydney Festival.

His experiential work includes cooperations with the British band These New Puritans, with jazz musician Uri Caine and composers Nico Muhly and Owen Pallett. There is also a close relation with Cologne-based MusikFabrik and with the electronic duo Mouse on Mars as well as collaboration with Efterklang. In 2012, de Ridder founded stargaze, a musical collective devoted to crossing borders between classical, pop, folk, electronic and 'uncategorizable' music. Together with this group he has performed in London, Manchester, Paris, Amsterdam, New York and Sydney, and has launched its own spring festival in Berlin.

In the field of opera, de Ridder has conducted among others works by Mozart, Leoš Janáček and Hans Werner Henze. He conducted several world premieres:
 Damon Albarn's and Chen Shi-Zheng's animation opera Monkey: Journey to the West at the Manchester International Festival (2007), later on also at the Théâtre du Châtelet in Paris and at the Royal Opera House Covent Garden in London
 Gerald Barry's The Bitter Tears of Petra von Kant at the English National Opera
 Wolfgang Rihm's Drei Frauen at the Theater Basel
 Donnacha Dennehy's The Last Hotel at the Edinburgh International Festival (2015).
Kaija Saariaho's Only the Sound Remains at Opera Forward Festival with Dutch National Opera (2016).
Daniel Bjarnason's Brothers at Den Jyske Oper (2017).
In addition he conducts opera performances at the Komische Oper Berlin, the Teatro Real in Madrid and the Finnish National Opera in Helsinki.

From 2007 to 2012, de Ridder was the Principal Conductor of the Sinfonia ViVA based in Derby, UK. Furthermore, he has been invited by Britten Sinfonia, London Sinfonietta and Philharmonia Orchestra, by the BBC Symphony Orchestra and several other BBC orchestras, by the Orchestre de Paris, the Copenhagen Philharmonic and the Chicago Symphony Orchestra. In 2013 he achieved an enormous success in Australia, conducting the sound track of Kubrick's 2001: A Space Odyssey at the Sydney Opera House and then again at the Symphony in the Domain and at the Adelaide Festival.

De Ridder is the co-curator and conductor of Unclassified Live, a series of genre-defying concerts at the Southbank Centre based on the BBC Radio 3 programme.

In February 2021, it was announced that he has been nominated as GMD elect of Theater Freiburg and Philharmonisches Orchester, starting September 2022.

Quote

Discography (selection) 
 Damon Alban: Dr Dee (Virgin) 
 Gorillaz: Plastic Beach (EMI), nominated for a Grammy
Max Richter: Recomposition of Vivaldi's The Four Seasons (Deutsche Grammophon), received an ECH Klassik award

References

External links
 Komische Oper Berlin, biography André de Ridder

German male conductors (music)
Living people
21st-century German conductors (music)
21st-century German male musicians
1971 births